Governor Lake may refer to:

 Governor Lake (Nova Scotia), lake in Nova Scotia
 Governor Lake, Nova Scotia, rural community in Nova Scotia